The 1956 Notre Dame Fighting Irish football team represented the University of Notre Dame during the 1956 NCAA University Division football season.
Paul Hornung carried the ball 94 times his senior year for 420 yards for an average of 4.5 yards per try. He completed 59 of 111 passes for a total offensive figure of 1,337 yards. He is the only Heisman winner to have played on a losing team as the Irish were 2–8 in 1956.

Schedule

Awards and honors
Paul Hornung, Heisman Trophy

Team players drafted into the NFL
The following players were drafted into professional football following the season.

References

Notre Dame
Notre Dame Fighting Irish football seasons
Notre Dame Fighting Irish football